Kwisŏng station is a railway station in Wŏn'ŭp-rodongjagu, Onch'ŏn county, Namp'o Special City, North Korea, on the P'yŏngnam Line of the Korean State Railway.

History

References

Railway stations in North Korea
Railway stations opened in 1938